Sarah Dawson may refer to:

 Sarah Dawson (field hockey) (born 1982), American field hockey player
 Sarah Dawson (softball) (born 1975), American softball pitcher and coach
 Sarah Lynn Dawson (born 1981), English actress and screenwriter
 Sarah Dawson (Survivor), competitor on Survivor: Philippines